The Ninth Battle of the Isonzo was an Italian offensive against Austria-Hungary in the course World War I. Including a triumvirate of battles launched after the Italians' successful seizure of Gorizia in August 1916 to extend their bridgehead to the left of the town, it ended in further failure for the Italian Chief of Staff Luigi Cadorna.

The battle started with an attack on Vrtojba and the northern and central areas of the Karst Plateau. With the ninth battle fought from 1–4 November 1916 the combined casualty total from the three linked battles proved sufficiently heavy to ensure that each attack was of short duration (each less than a week). The Italians suffered 75,000 casualties and the Austro-Hungarians 63,000.

As always along the Soča (Isonzo), the Austro-Hungarian Army's command of the mountainous terrain provided a formidable natural barrier to the Italians' attempts to achieve a breakthrough.  Cadorna had intended to ensure such a breakthrough in the wake of the capture of Gorizia during the Sixth Battle of the Isonzo, but instead the war of attrition gathered pace.

Neither side could particularly afford the casualties suffered but the Austro-Hungarians in particular were finding their defensive lines increasingly stretched.  Realising this they continued to call upon their German ally to provide military assistance within the sector.  When the Germans finally assented (sensing the potential collapse of the Austro-Hungarian position) and constructed a combined force in time for the Twelfth Battle of Isonzo, the results were dramatic.

However, with the ninth battle called off in failure on 4 November 1916 and the Italians undeniably weakened by continual offensive operations throughout the year - 1916 had seen five Isonzo operations on top of four undertaken the year before - a lengthy break was taken for the winter.

Operations renewed afresh with the Tenth Battle of the Isonzo on 12 May 1917.

See also
First Battle of the Isonzo - 23 June–7 July 1915
Second Battle of the Isonzo - 18 July–3 August 1915
Third Battle of the Isonzo - 18 October–3 November 1915
Fourth Battle of the Isonzo - 10 November–2 December 1915
Fifth Battle of the Isonzo - 9–17 March 1916
Sixth Battle of the Isonzo - 6–17 August 1916
Seventh Battle of the Isonzo - 14–17 September 1916
Eighth Battle of the Isonzo - 10–12 October 1916
Tenth Battle of the Isonzo - 12 May–8 June 1917
Eleventh Battle of the Isonzo - 19 August–12 September 1917
Twelfth Battle of the Isonzo - 24 October–7 November 1917 also known as the Battle of Caporetto

References

Further reading

External links
FirstWorldWar.Com: The Battles of the Isonzo, 1915-17
Battlefield Maps: Italian Front
11 battles at the Isonzo
The Walks of Peace in the Soča Region Foundation. The Foundation preserves, restores and presents the historical and cultural heritage of the First World War in the area of the Isonzo Front for the study, tourist and educational purposes.
The Kobarid Museum (in English)
Društvo Soška Fronta (in Slovenian)
Pro Hereditate - extensive site (in En/It/Sl)

Isonzo 03
Isonzo 09
Isonzo 09
Isonzo 09
the Isonzo
1916 in Italy
1916 in Austria-Hungary
October 1916 events
November 1916 events